Klaviermusik (English: Piano Music) is the sixth release of Einstürzende Neubauten's Musterhaus project, a series of highly experimental CD releases that were only available via an annual subscription through their website or from shows during their 25th Anniversary Tour. This project was separate from their Neubauten.org Supporter Project, to which it ran concurrent.

The central idea of this Musterhaus release is providing new recordings of both rare and old piano compositions by individual members of the band and entirely new compositions by them, all played on one piano in Ari Benjamin Meyer's apartment.

Track listing
 "Die Wellen" - 3:31
 "Kinderladenklavier" - 7:28
 "Marsch derer die sich wiedernehmen was ihnen sowieso gehört" - 4:05
 "Burleske für 6 Hände" - 5:45
 "Emanuelle" - 7:30
 "Guerilla für 2 Pianisten" - 1:43
 "Virginie" - 3:04
 "Filmkuss" - 2:54
 "Die Befindlichkeit des Landes" - 6:23
 "Katowice" - 3:26

Notes
"Burleske für 6 Hände" played by Jochen Arbeit, Jo Jo Röhm and Ari Benjamin Meyers
"Guerilla für 2 Pianisten" played by N.U. Unruh and Blixa Bargeld
"Kinderladenklavier" played by N.U. Unruh, arranged by Ari Benjamin Meyers
Voices on "Die Wellen" Blixa Bargeld
Voices on "Filmkuss" Alexander Hacke
"Filmkuss" originally by Ton Steine Scherben
"Die Befindlichkeit des Landes" appears in original form on their 2000 album Silence Is Sexy
"Die Wellen" re-appears in altered form on their 2007 album Alles wieder offen

Recorded July 3, 2006 by E.N. and Ari Benjamin Meyers
Produced by Einstürzende Neubauten
Mixed, edited, and mastered by Boris Wilsdorf, assisted by Macro Paschke

External links 
Musterhaus Project website
Neubauten website
Ari Benjamin Meyers website

Einstürzende Neubauten albums
2006 albums